Hervé Island is the mostly ice-covered rocky island in the Barcroft group of Biscoe Islands in Antarctica 900 m long in south-southwest to north-northeast direction and 290 m wide. Its surface area is 14.16 ha.

The feature is named after the Chilean geologist Francisco Hervé Allamand, for his contribution to Antarctic geology and the Bulgarian Antarctic programme.

Location

Maps
 British Antarctic Territory. Scale 1:200000 topographic map. DOS 610 Series, Sheet W 66 66. Directorate of Overseas Surveys, UK, 1976
 Antarctic Digital Database (ADD). Scale 1:250000 topographic map of Antarctica. Scientific Committee on Antarctic Research (SCAR). Since 1993, regularly upgraded and updated

See also
 List of Antarctic and subantarctic islands

Notes

References
 Bulgarian Antarctic Gazetteer. Antarctic Place-names Commission. (details in Bulgarian, basic data in English)

External links
 Hervé Island. Adjusted Copernix satellite image

Islands of the Biscoe Islands
Bulgaria and the Antarctic